E. A. P. Sivaji is an Indian politician and was a Member of the Legislative Assembly (MLA). He was elected to the Tamil Nadu legislative assembly as a Dravida Munnetra Kazhagam (DMK) candidate from Tiruttani constituency in the 1996 election.

Having lost his Tiruttani seat to G. Raviraj of the Pattali Makkal Katchi in 2001, Sivaji stood in the 2006 assembly elections for the Tirvallur constituency at a time when he was district secretary of the DMK in that area. He won the seat then but in the 2011 election he was runner-up to B. V. Ramanaa of the All India Anna Dravida Munnetra Kazhagam.

Electoral performance

References 

Living people
Dravida Munnetra Kazhagam politicians
Tamil Nadu MLAs 1996–2001
Tamil Nadu MLAs 2006–2011
Year of birth missing (living people)